The C. H. Moore Homestead, in Clinton, Illinois, is one of two Registered Historic Places in DeWitt County. The other, the Magill House, was added to the Register in 2003. CH Moore Homestead DeWitt County Museum was added in 1979.

History
Construction was started on the C. H. Moore Homestead by John and Minerva Moore Bishop. Mr. Bishop was a prosperous grain and lumber dealer in Clinton. Work on the C. H. Moore Homestead was completed in 1867 after the Civil War had ended and life took on a more normal pattern. Soon after this, the Bishops lost their only child. After Minerva Bishop's death in the early 1880s, Mr. Bishop sold the house to his brother-in-law, Clifton H. Moore.

Moore, an educated man, was the first attorney to commence practice in Clinton, having hung out his shingle in 1841.  He served as co-counsel with Abraham Lincoln on several cases heard in the DeWitt County circuit court, of which future United States Supreme Court justice David Davis was the presiding judge.

The west wing of the home was added in 1887 to house Mr. Moore's vast collection of books. At the time of his death, he owned approximately 7,000 volumes, the largest collection of books in downstate Illinois. The two-story high library has a vaulted ceiling and stenciled walls. There are four-season windows on the upper level, and an iron railing around the suspended upper gallery. The furniture and paintings include many of the original Moore furnishings. Moore's book collection was left to the city of Clinton upon his death and is now housed at the Vespasian Warner Public Library.

Moore lived in the house until his death in 1901. The house sat in disrepair for several decades until 1967 when it was purchased and restored by the newly formed DeWitt County Museum Association. The Apple 'N Pork festival, held annually the last full weekend in September, was first held in 1968 to help raise funds to restore and maintain the mansion.

C.H. Moore Homestead Dewitt County Museum
The C. H. Moore Homestead DeWitt County Museum is the centerpiece of the Apple 'n Pork Festival.  This festival is held annually on the last weekend of September and has become one of central Illinois' largest festivals.  The C.H. Moore Homestead DeWitt County Museum includes the restored Victorian mansion, original carriage barn, gardens, replica of an Indiana-style covered bridge, working blacksmith shop, three barns filled with antique farm equipment, tools, buggies, sleighs, autos, railroad items, and working telephone display.

Notes

External links
C. H. Moore Homestead  Dewitt County Museum

Houses on the National Register of Historic Places in Illinois
Houses in DeWitt County, Illinois
Historic house museums in Illinois
Open-air museums in Illinois
Museums in DeWitt County, Illinois
National Register of Historic Places in DeWitt County, Illinois